Denis William Hallett (10 December 1922 – 11 November 2013) was a British weightlifter. He competed in the men's featherweight event at the 1948 Summer Olympics.

References

1922 births
2013 deaths
British male weightlifters
Olympic weightlifters of Great Britain
Weightlifters at the 1948 Summer Olympics
Sportspeople from Newcastle-under-Lyme